Orseolia oryzivora, also called the African rice gall midge, is a species of small fly in the family Cecidomyiidae. It is a major insect pest of rice crops in Africa.

Monitoring
Orseolia oryzivora and O. oryzae are morphologically, and even microscopically, indistinguishable, and so DNA differentiation methods have been developed.

References

Agricultural pest insects
Cecidomyiidae
Diptera of Africa